Dyschirius contortus is a species of ground beetle in the subfamily Scaritinae. It was described by Fedorenko in 1997.

References

contortus
Beetles described in 1997